Dupont, variously styled as DuPont, duPont, Du Pont, or du Pont is a French surname meaning "of the bridge", historically indicating that the holder of the surname resided near a bridge.

People
 Du Pont family, an American family descended from Pierre Samuel du Pont de Nemours
 Aimé Dupont (1841–1900), Belgian-born American photographer
 Alfred I. du Pont (1864–1935), American industrialist, financier, philanthropist, cellist
 André Dupont (born 1949), retired National Hockey League player
 Andrée Dupont-Roc, French curler and coach
 Antoine Dupont (born 1996), French professional Rugby Union player
 Aurélie Dupont (born 1973), Paris Opera Ballet étoile
 Chantal duPont (1942–2019), Canadian multidisciplinary artist
 Charles H. DuPont (1805–1877), Florida Supreme Court justice
 Christian Dupont (born 1947), Belgian politician
 Christian Dupont-Roc, French and Dutch curler
 Clifford Dupont (1905–1978), president of Rhodesia
 Denise Dupont (born 1984), Danish curler
 Dominique Dupont-Roc (born 1963), French curler, 1992 and 2002 Winter Olympics participant
 E. A. Dupont (1891–1956), German movie director
 Éleuthère Irénée du Pont (1771–1834), founder of E. I. du Pont de Nemours and Company
 Gabriel Dupont (1878–1914), French composer
 George Dupont (c. 18441900), Thai soldier in American Civil War
 Ghislaine Dupont (1956–2013), French journalist
 Herbert L. DuPont (born 1938), American physician, medical school professor, and medical researcher
 Hubert Dupont (born 1980), professional cyclist
 Irénée du Pont (1876–1963), U.S. businessman, former president of DuPont 
 Jacques Dupont (director) (1921–2013), French film director
 Jacques-Charles Dupont de l'Eure (1767–1855), French lawyer and statesman
 John du Pont (1938–2010), philanthropist, convicted of murdering Olympic wrestler Dave Schultz
 Leo Dupont (1797–1876), Venerable, Catholic religious figure
 Léon Dupont (1881–1956), Belgian athlete
 Leonard Dupont (1796–1828), French naturalist
 Madeleine Dupont (born 1987), Danish curler
 Margaret Osborne duPont (1918–2012), American tennis champion
 Micki DuPont (born 1980), Canadian ice hockey player
 Nicolas Dupont-Aignan (born 1961), French politician
 Pierre Dupont de l'Étang (1765–1840), general of the French Revolutionary and Napoleonic Wars
 Pierre Dupont (1821–1870), French songwriter
 Pierre S. du Pont (1870–1954), president of E. I. du Pont de Nemours and General Motors
 Pete du Pont (1935–2021), American governor of Delaware
 Pierre Samuel du Pont de Nemours (1739–1817), French writer, economist, government official
 Richard Henry Puech Dupont (1798-1873), French naturalist
 Samuel Francis Du Pont (1803–1865), U.S. Navy admiral
 Tiffany Dupont (born 1981), American actress
 Zara DuPont (1869-1946), American suffragist

In song and fiction
 "Monsieur Dupont", a 1969 single by British singer Sandie Shaw

References

Surnames of French origin
Surnames of Belgian origin
French-language surnames